Zvyozdny, formerly Perm-76, is a closed urban locality (an urban-type settlement) in Perm Krai, Russia. Population:

History
A permanent military summer camp was established in place of modern Zvyozdny in 1931. Originally, the camp was use for military training of infantry, artillery, and cavalry. It was supplied with guns from nearby Perm and with horses from the stud farms in the vicinity. In 1941, when Nazi Germany attacked USSR, the camp was converted into a permanent installation which continued to be used after the war ended.

Administrative and municipal status
Within the framework of administrative divisions, it is incorporated as the closed administrative-territorial formation of Zvyozdny—an administrative unit with the status equal to that of the districts. As a municipal division, the closed administrative-territorial formation of Zvyozdny is incorporated as Zvyozdny Urban Okrug.

See also
 List of closed cities

References

Notes

Sources

Urban-type settlements in Perm Krai
Closed cities